Michael James (born 30 December 1971) is a former Australian rules footballer who played with Carlton in the Australian Football League (AFL).

He is the son of Brownlow Medal winner John James.

Notes

External links

Michael James's profile at Blueseum

Carlton Football Club players
Australian rules footballers from Victoria (Australia)
Living people
1971 births